John St John (died 1302), of Basing in Hampshire, was a soldier who served as Lieutenant of Aquitaine.

Origins
He was the son of Robert de St John (d.1267) by his wife believed to have been Agnes de Cantilupe, a daughter of William de Cantilupe.

Career
John inherited his fathers title in 1267, upon the death of his father and succeeded him as governor of Porchester Castle in Hampshire. In November 1276, he was one of the magnates present at the council which judgment was given against Llywelyn ap Gruffudd. He participated in King Edward I of England's invasions of Wales in 1277 and 1282. He was summoned to the Shrewsbury parliament in 1283. During Edward I's stay in Aquitaine between 1286-1289, he was involved in negotiations between King Alfonso III of Aragon and King Charles II of Naples and was one of the hostages handed over to King Alfonso III in 1288 to secure the conditions upon which the Charles, Prince of Salerno had been released. He returned to England in early 1289 and attended parliament in May 1290.

St John was despatched in 1290 on a mission to Pope Nicholas IV regarding the crusading a projected crusade. During March, St John was at Tarascon, dealing with business from Edward I's mediation between Sicily and Aragon. In November 1292, St John was in Scotland attending on the king, during the selection of the next King of Scotland, in favour of John Balliol.

In 1293, relations between Edward I and King Philip IV of France became strained, and St John was dispatched to Gascony as the king's lieutenant. St John went about strengthening and provisioning the fortified towns and castles, and in providing adequate garrisons for them. Edmund Crouchback unwittingly allowed the temporary possession of the Gascon strongholds, without legal authority by the French. St John deliver seisin of Gascony to its French overlord and admitted the French into the castles, sold off the provisions and stores that he had collected, and returned to England by way of Paris.

Edward I, angered by the French occupation of Aquitaine, prepared to recover his inheritance by force. Due to instability and revolution in Wales, Edward I appointed his nephew John of Brittany as his lieutenant in Aquitaine with St John as seneschal and chief counsellor on 1 July 1294. The expedition left Plymouth on 1 October, arriving at the Gironde estuary on the 28 October. Macau was captured on 31 October and Bourg and Blaye were next subdued. The fleet then sailed up the Garonne river to Bordeaux, however failed to capture the town. Rions was then captured, along with Podensac and Villeneuve. St John left John of Brittany at Rions, travelling with a force by river and sea to Bayonne and attacked the town. On 1 January 1295 the citizens of Bayonne, drove the French garrison into the castle and opened the town gates to him. St John attacked Bayonne Castle, which surrendered eleven days later after a siege. Many Gascons then joined the English army.

Charles of Valois, invaded Aquitaine at the head of a French army and won back most of the English conquests in the Garonne valley. St John and John of Brittany were at Rions, however were so alarmed at the fall of the neighbouring towns that they abandoned Rions, with the French re-entering Rions on 8 April 1295. King Edward I sent Edmund of Lancaster in 1296 to take over command at Bordeaux. During the siege of Bayonne in 1296, the English ran out of money, so the army disbanded. Disheartened Edmund died on 5 June 1296. Henry de Lacy, Earl of Lincoln took over command with St John as Seneschal. Bayonne was again recaptured after an eight-day siege. On 28 January 1297 St John marched with de Lacy to convey provisions to Bellegarde, which being besieged by Robert, Count of Artois. The English army was ambushed and St John's column was attacked and St John was taken prisoner along with ten other knights.  St John was sent to Paris and was kept in captivity until being released after the Treaty of Montreuil in the summer of 1299. His captivity caused St John to be in heavy debts and was forced to pledge four of his manors for sixteen years to the merchants of the society of the Buonsignori of Siena.

On 3 January 1300, St John was appointed the king's lieutenant and captain in Cumberland, Westmoreland, Lancashire, Annandale, and the other marches west of Roxburgh. During the famous siege of Carlaverock in 1300, St John was entrusted with the custody of Prince Edward of Carnarvon, Edward I's son, who was taking part in his first campaign. During 1301, St John was warden of Galloway and the sheriffdom of Dumfries, as well as of the adjacent marches. In the spring of that year he was appointed, with John de Warenne, Earl of Surrey and others, to treat at Canterbury of a peace between the English and the Scots with the envoys of Philip IV of France. In January 1301 St John was at the Lincoln parliament, and signed the Barons' Letter of 1301 to the pope, although not himself a baron, never having been summoned by writ to parliament. On 12 July 1302 he was with the king at Westminster, however returned to his border command, where he died on Thursday 6 September 1302, at Lochmaben Castle, Scotland.

Marriage and issue
St John married Alice FitzPeter, a daughter of Reginald FitzPeter, by whom he had issue including:
John St John, 1st Baron St John (d. 1329) of Basing, who married Isabel Courtenay, had issue.
William St John
Edward St John
Amadeus St John
Agnes St John, who married Hugh de Courtenay, 1st/9th Earl of Devon, by whom she had issue.

Death and burial
He died on Thursday 6 September 1302, at Lochmaben Castle in Scotland and was buried in St Mary's Church, Old Basing, Hampshire.

Citations

References

Year of birth unknown
1302 deaths
13th-century English people
14th-century English people
Medieval English knights
Seneschals of Gascony
People from Old Basing